Bjørn Jarle Ørnø Røberg-Larsen (born 1973, in Oslo) is a Norwegian politician for the Labour Party in the city of Elverum and in the regional parliament of Hedmark (Hedmark Fylkesting), as well as a Norwegian internet entrepreneur.

He is also the editor and publisher of Sosialdemokraten.no, a blog about social democratic politics.

Røberg-Larsen now holds the position as second deputy for the Labour Party to the regional parliament of Hedmark county (Hedmark Fylkesting). From 2007 to 2009, he served as the first deputy and from 2009 to 2011 as permanent council member. He has in particular engaged in political issues concerning transportation and infrastructure. 

Since May 2012, he represents the counties of Hedmark, Oppland and Akershus as their first deputy to the Port Board of Oslo (Oslo Havnestyre). 

Between 2008 and 2010, Røberg-Larsen was chairman in the Elverum branch of the Labour Party. He now holds the position as leader of Leiret Arbeiderlag, the Labour Party's largest division between Oslo and Trondheim (205 members per 31.12.2012). 

Between 1992 and 1994, Røberg Larsen was treasurer and youth secretary of the Oslo chapter of the Workers' Youth League (AUF). Røberg-Larsen was the only board member of the organization that admitted to the facts of the false information. 

He was as well the only of the four prosecuted board members that assisted both the police and the municipal authorities by explaining what he had been involved in. 

His lies led to an ice front between him and the organization, and on 12 December 1996, he was excluded from AUF. 

Røberg-Larsen is the sole shareholder of BJRL Media Ltd. A company well known for its cutting edge methodes for promoting credit cards, apartments for rent and other services.

References

1973 births
Living people
Labour Party (Norway) politicians